The 2022–23 Golden State Warriors season is the 77th season of the franchise in the National Basketball Association (NBA), their 61st in the San Francisco Bay Area, their fourth season at the Chase Center, 9th season with Steve Kerr as a head coach and 12th season with Bob Myers as a general manager. The Warriors entered the season as defending champions after winning the 2022 NBA Finals against the Boston Celtics during the previous season in six games to win their fourth championship in eight years and seventh overall.

Draft

The Warriors will enter the draft holding one first round picks and two second round picks. On draft night they traded the 51st pick (Tyrese Martin) and cash considerations ($2,000,000) to the Atlanta Hawks in exchange for the 44th pick (Ryan Rollins).

Standings

Division

Conference

Roster

Game log
All played matches and all upcoming games for current season are listed below. For more info about the games and where to watch the game on TV, there are several online services and apps to help you with that.

Preseason

|- style="background:#ccffcc;"
| 1
| September 30
| @ Washington
| 
| James Wiseman (20)
| James Wiseman (9)
| Jonathan Kuminga (3)
| Saitama Super Arena20,497
| 1–0
|- style="background:#ccffcc;"
| 2
| October 1
| Washington
| 
| Stephen Curry (17)
| Kevon Looney (7)
| Draymond Green (5)
| Saitama Super Arena20,647
| 2–0
|- style="background:#fcc;
| 3
| October 9
| L.A. Lakers
| 
| Jordan Poole (25)
| Jonathan Kuminga (8)
| Jordan Poole (6)
| Chase Center18,064
| 2–1
|- style="background:#cfc;
| 4
| October 11
| Portland
| 
| JaMychal Green (20)
| JaMychal Green (8)
| Donte DiVincenzo (10)
| Chase Center18,064
| 3–1
|- style="background:#fcc;
| 5
| October 14
| Denver
| 
| Thompson, Kuminga (17)
| Kuminga, Wiseman (6)
| Jonathan Kuminga (7)
| Chase CenterN/A
| 3–2

Regular season

|-style="background:#cfc"
| 1
| October 18
| L.A. Lakers
| 
| Stephen Curry (33)
| Wiseman, J. Green (7)
| Curry, Poole (7)
| Chase Center18,064
| 1–0
|-style="background:#fcc"
| 2
| October 21
| Denver
| 
| Stephen Curry (34)
| Andrew Wiggins (8)
| Draymond Green (9)
| Chase Center18,064
| 1–1
|-style="background:#cfc"
| 3
| October 23
| Sacramento
| 
| Stephen Curry (33)
| Kevon Looney (8)
| Kevon Looney (6)
| Chase Center18,064
| 2–1
|-style="background:#fcc;"
| 4
| October 25
| @ Phoenix
| 
| Stephen Curry (21)
| Draymond Green (8)
| Stephen Curry (8)
| Footprint Center18,055
| 2–2
|-style="background:#cfc"
| 5
| October 27
| Miami
| 
| Stephen Curry (33)
| Andrew Wiggins (10)
| Stephen Curry (9)
| Chase Center18,064
| 3–2
|-style="background:#fcc"
| 6
| October 29
| @ Charlotte
| 
| Stephen Curry (31)
| Stephen Curry (11)
| D. Green, Curry (6)
| Spectrum Center19,079
| 3–3
|-style="background:#fcc"
| 7
| October 30
| @ Detroit
| 
| Stephen Curry (32)
| Kevon Looney (9)
| Draymond Green (7)
| Little Caesars Arena20,190
| 3–4

|-style="background:#fcc"
| 8
| November 1
| @ Miami
| 
| Stephen Curry (23)
| Stephen Curry (13)
| Stephen Curry (13)
| FTX Arena19,600
| 3–5
|-style="background:#fcc"
| 9
| November 3
| @ Orlando
| 
| Stephen Curry (39)
| Kevon Looney (7)
| Stephen Curry (9)
| Amway Center18,846
| 3–6
|-style="background:#fcc"
| 10
| November 4
| @ New Orleans
| 
| Jordan Poole (20)
| Jerome, Wiseman (6)
| Jordan Poole (9)
| Smoothie King Center18,451
| 3–7
|-style="background:#cfc"
| 11
| November 7
| Sacramento
| 
| Stephen Curry (47)
| Kevon Looney (13)
| Stephen Curry (8)
| Chase Center18,064
| 4–7
|-style="background:#cfc"
| 12
| November 11
| Cleveland
| 
| Stephen Curry (40)
| D. Green, Looney (9)
| Draymond Green (13)
| Chase Center18,064
| 5–7
|-style="background:#fcc"
| 13
| November 13
| @ Sacramento
| 
| Stephen Curry (27)
| Kevon Looney (10)
| Draymond Green (11)
| Golden 1 Center16,410
| 5–8
|-style="background:#cfc"
| 14
| November 14
| San Antonio
| 
| Jordan Poole (36)
| Draymond Green (7)
| Draymond Green (6)
| Chase Center18,064
| 6–8
|-style="background:#fcc"
| 15
| November 16
| @ Phoenix
| 
| Stephen Curry (50)
| Stephen Curry (9)
| Green, Poole (8)
| Footprint Center17,071
| 6–9
|-style="background:#cfc"
| 16
| November 18
| New York
| 
| Stephen Curry (24)
| Draymond Green (9)
| Stephen Curry (10)
| Chase Center18,064
| 7–9
|-style="background:#cfc"
| 17
| November 20
| @ Houston
| 
| Klay Thompson (41)
| Kevon Looney (7)
| Stephen Curry (15)
| Toyota Center18,055
| 8–9
|-style="background:#fcc"
| 18
| November 21
| @ New Orleans
| 
| Jordan Poole (26)
| JaMychal Green (8)
| DiVincenzo, Lamb (5)
| Smoothie King Center18,589
| 8–10
|-style="background:#cfc"
| 19
| November 23
| L.A. Clippers
| 
| Andrew Wiggins (31)
| D. Green, Lamb (7)
| Draymond Green (12)
| Chase Center18,064
| 9–10
|-style="background:#cfc"
| 20
| November 25
| Utah
| 
| Stephen Curry (33)
| Kevon Looney (12)
| Jordan Poole (6)
| Chase Center18,064
| 10–10
|-style="background:#cfc;"
| 21
| November 27
| @ Minnesota
| 
| Stephen Curry (25)
| Stephen Curry (11)
| Draymond Green (11)
| Target Center17,136
| 11–10
|-style="background:#fcc;"
| 22
| November 29
| @ Dallas
| 
| Stephen Curry (32)
| Jonathan Kuminga (10)
| Jordan Poole (9)
| American Airlines Center20,277
| 11–11

|-style="background:#cfc;"
| 23
| December 2
| Chicago
| 
| Jordan Poole (30)
| Kevon Looney (12)
| Draymond Green (10)
| Chase Center18,064
| 12–11
|-style="background:#cfc;"
| 24
| December 3
| Houston
| 
| Andrew Wiggins (36)
| Kevon Looney (12)
| Stephen Curry (10)
| Chase Center18,064
| 13–11
|-style="background:#fcc;"
| 25
| December 5
| Indiana
| 
| Klay Thompson (28)
| Draymond Green (9)
| Stephen Curry (6)
| Chase Center18,064
| 13–12
|-style="background:#fcc;"
| 26
| December 7
| @ Utah
| 
| Jordan Poole (36)
| DiVincenzo, Looney (9)
| Jordan Poole (8)
| Vivint Arena18,206
| 13–13
|-style="background:#cfc;"
| 27
| December 10
| Boston
| 
| Klay Thompson (34)
| Kevon Looney (15)
| Stephen Curry (7)
| Chase Center18,064
| 14–13
|-style="background:#fcc;"
| 28
| December 13
| @ Milwaukee
| 
| Stephen Curry (20)
| Kevon Looney (8)
| Draymond Green (7)
| Fiserv Forum17,628
| 14–14
|-style="background:#fcc;"
| 29
| December 14
| @ Indiana
| 
| Stephen Curry (38)
| DiVincenzo, Kuminga (8)
| Stephen Curry (7)
| Gainbridge Fieldhouse15,069
| 14–15
|-style="background:#fcc;"
| 30
| December 16
| @ Philadelphia
| 
| Jordan Poole (29)
| Kevon Looney (11)
| Kevon Looney (9)
| Wells Fargo Center20,567
| 14–16
|-style="background:#cfc;"
| 31
| December 18
| @ Toronto
| 
| Jordan Poole (43)
| Kevon Looney (11)
| Poole, DiVincenzo (6)
| Scotiabank Arena19,800
| 15–16
|-style="background:#fcc;"
| 32
| December 20
| @ New York
| 
| Jordan Poole (26)
| Kevon Looney (6)
| Draymond Green (6)
| Madison Square Garden19,812
| 15–17
|-style="background:#fcc;"
| 33
| December 21
| @ Brooklyn
| 
| James Wiseman (30)
| Kevon Looney (7)
| Ty Jerome (7)
| Barclays Center18,026
| 15–18
|-style="background:#cfc;"
| 34
| December 25
| Memphis
| 
| Jordan Poole (32)
| Draymond Green (13)
| Draymond Green (13)
| Chase Center18,064
| 16–18
|-style="background:#cfc;"
| 35
| December 27
| Charlotte
| 
| Jordan Poole (29)
| Draymond Green (10)
| Donte DiVincenzo (7)
| Chase Center18,064
| 17–18
|-style="background:#cfc;"
| 36
| December 28
| Utah
| 
| Jordan Poole (26)
| Kevon Looney (12)
| D. Green, Looney (5)
| Chase Center18,064
| 18–18
|-style="background:#cfc;"
| 37
| December 30
| Portland
| 
| Jordan Poole (41)
| D. Green, Looney (11)
| Kuminga, Poole (6)
| Chase Center18,064
| 19–18

|-style="background:#cfc;"
| 38
| January 2
| Atlanta
| 
| Klay Thompson (54)
| Kevon Looney (20)
| Draymond Green (11)
| Chase Center18,064
| 20–18
|-style="background:#fcc;"
| 39
| January 4
| Detroit
| 
| Klay Thompson (30)
| Kevon Looney (15)
| Draymond Green (7)
| Chase Center18,064
| 20–19
|-style="background:#fcc;"
| 40
| January 7
| Orlando
| 
| Anthony Lamb (26)
| Kevon Looney (12)
| D. Green, Poole (6)
| Chase Center18,061
| 20–20
|-style="background:#fcc;"
| 41
| January 10
| Phoenix
| 
| Klay Thompson (29)
| Draymond Green (12)
| D. Green, Poole (6)
| Chase Center18,064
| 20–21
|-style="background:#cfc;"
| 42
| January 13
| @ San Antonio
| 
| Jordan Poole (25)
| Draymond Green (12)
| Jordan Poole (6)
| Alamodome68,323
| 21–21
|-style="background:#fcc;"
| 43
| January 15
| @ Chicago
| 
| Klay Thompson (26)
| Stephen Curry (10)
| Draymond Green (7)
| United Center20,139
| 21–22
|-style="background:#cfc;"
| 44
| January 16
| @ Washington
| 
| Stephen Curry (41)
| Kevon Looney (9)
| Draymond Green (7)
| Capital One Arena20,476
| 22–22
|-style="background:#fcc;"
| 45
| January 19
| @ Boston
| 
| Stephen Curry (29)
| Draymond Green (13)
| Draymond Green (9)
| TD Garden19,156
| 22–23
|-style="background:#cfc;"
| 46
| January 20
| @ Cleveland
| 
| Jordan Poole (32)
| Kevon Looney (17)
| Ty Jerome (8)
| Rocket Mortgage FieldHouse19,432
| 23–23
|-style="background:#fcc;"
| 47
| January 22
| Brooklyn
| 
| Stephen Curry (26)
| Draymond Green (11)
| Curry, D. Green (6)
| Chase Center18,064
| 23–24
|-style="background:#cfc;"
| 48
| January 25
| Memphis
| 
| Stephen Curry (34)
| Draymond Green (13)
| D. Green, Poole (7)
| Chase Center18,064
| 24–24
|-style="background:#cfc;"
| 49
| January 27
| Toronto
| 
| Stephen Curry (35)
| Looney, Thompson (8) 
| Stephen Curry (11)
| Chase Center18,064
| 25–24
|-style="background:#cfc;"
| 50
| January 30
| @ Oklahoma City
| 
| Stephen Curry (38)
| Draymond Green (9)
| Curry, D. Green (12)
| Paycom Center16,854
| 26–24

|-style="background:#fcc;"
| 51
| February 1
| @ Minnesota
| 
| Stephen Curry (29)
| Draymond Green (12)
| DiVincenzo, Poole (5)
| Target Center17,136
| 26–25
|-style="background:#fcc;"
| 52
| February 2
| @ Denver
| 
| Stephen Curry (28)
| Andrew Wiggins (10)
| Curry, Poole (5)
| Ball Arena19,555
| 26–26
|-style="background:#cfc;"
| 53
| February 4
| Dallas
| 
| Stephen Curry (21)
| Draymond Green (9)
| Draymond Green (9)
| Chase Center18,064
| 27–26
|-style="background:#cfc;"
| 54
| February 6
| Oklahoma City
| 
| Klay Thompson (42)
| Kevon Looney (11)
| Jordan Poole (12)
| Chase Center18,064
| 28–26
|-style="background:#fcc;"
| 55
| February 8
| @ Portland
| 
| Jordan Poole (38)
| Andrew Wiggins (10)
| D. Green, Poole (7)
| Moda Center18,450
| 28–27
|-style="background:#fcc;"
| 56
| February 11
| L.A. Lakers
| 
| Jordan Poole (29)
| Kevon Looney (13)
| Draymond Green (10)
| Chase Center18,064
| 28–28
|-style="background:#cfc;"
| 57
| February 13
| Washington
| 
| Andrew Wiggins (29)
| Kevon Looney (13)
| Ty Jerome (7)
| Chase Center18,064
| 29–28
|-style="background:#fcc;"
| 58
| February 14
| @ L.A. Clippers
| 
| Jordan Poole (28)
| Kevon Looney (14)
| Draymond Green (7)
| Crypto.com Arena16,741
| 29–29
|-style="background:#fcc;"
| 59
| February 23
| @ L.A. Lakers
| 
| Klay Thompson (22)
| Kevon Looney (15)
| D. Green, Kuminga (5)
| Crypto.com Arena18,997
| 29–30
|-style="background:#cfc;"
| 60
| February 24
| Houston
| 
| Klay Thompson (42)
| Kevon Looney (13)
| Jordan Poole (8)
| Chase Center18,064
| 30–30
|-style="background:#cfc;"
| 61
| February 26
| Minnesota
| 
| Klay Thompson (32)
| Kevon Looney (17)
| Donte DiVincenzo (5)
| Chase Center18,064
| 31–30
|-style="background:#cfc;"
| 62
| February 28
| Portland
| 
| Jordan Poole (29)
| Draymond Green (9)
| Draymond Green (8)
| Chase Center18,064
| 32–30

|-style="background:#cfc;"
| 63
| March 2
| L.A. Clippers
| 
| Jordan Poole (34)
| DiVincenzo, Thompson (11)
| Draymond Green (9)
| Chase Center18,064
| 33–30
|-style="background:#cfc;"
| 64
| March 3
| New Orleans
| 
| Klay Thompson (27)
| Kevon Looney (11)
| Jordan Poole (7)
| Chase Center18,064
| 34–30
|-style="background:#fcc;"
| 65
| March 5
| @ L.A. Lakers 
| 
| Stephen Curry (27)
| Draymond Green (8)
| Curry, DiVincenzo (6)
| Crypto.com Arena18,997
| 34–31
|-style="background:#fcc;"
| 66
| March 7
| @ Oklahoma City
| 
| Stephen Curry (40)
| Curry, DiVincenzo (6)
| Draymond Green (11)
| Paycom Center16,142
| 34–32
|-style="background:#fcc;"
| 67
| March 9
| @ Memphis
| 
| Stephen Curry (29)
| Curry, Looney (7)
| Draymond Green (7)
| FedExForum17,794
| 34–33
|-style="background:#cfc"
| 68
| March 11
| Milwaukee
| 
| Stephen Curry (36)
| Kevon Looney (15)
| Draymond Green (9)
| Chase Center18,064
| 35–33
|-style="background:#cfc;"
| 69
| March 13
| Phoenix
| 
| Klay Thompson (38)
| Kevon Looney (10)
| Jordan Poole (6)
| Chase Center18,064
| 36–33
|-style="background:#fcc;"
| 70
| March 15
| @ L.A. Clippers
| 
| Stephen Curry (50)
| Kevon Looney (13)
| Stephen Curry (6)
| Crypto.com Arena19,068
| 36–34
|-style="background:#fcc;"
| 71
| March 17
| @ Atlanta
| 
| Stephen Curry (31)
| Kevon Looney (16)
| Donte DiVincenzo (6)
| State Farm Arena18,201
| 36–35
|-style="background:#fcc;"
| 72
| March 18
| @ Memphis
| 
| Jonathan Kuminga (24) 
| Curry, Kuminga (8)
| Donte DiVincenzo (7)
| FedExForum18,396
| 36–36
|-
| 73
| March 20
| @ Houston
| 
|  
|  
|  
| Toyota Center
| 
|-
| 74
| March 22
| @ Dallas
| 
|  
|  
|  
| American Airlines Center
| 
|-
| 75
| March 24
| Philadelphia
| 
|  
|  
|  
| Chase Center
| 
|-
| 76
| March 26
| Minnesota
| 
|  
|  
|  
| Chase Center
| 
|-
| 77
| March 28
| New Orleans
| 
|  
|  
|  
| Chase Center
| 
|-
| 78
| March 31
| San Antonio
| 
|  
|  
|  
| Chase Center
| 
|-

Transactions

Trades

Free agency

Re-signed

Additions

Subtractions

Notes

References

Golden State Warriors seasons
Golden State
2022 in San Francisco
2023 in San Francisco
Golden State Warriors
Golden State Warriors